Itasca is a station on Metra's Milwaukee District West Line in Itasca, Illinois. In Metra's zone-based fare system, Itasca is in zone E. As of 2018, Itasca is the 91st busiest of Metra's 236 non-downtown stations, with an average of 555 weekday boardings.

As of December 12, 2022, Itasca is served by 42 trains (20 inbound, 22 outbound) on weekdays, by all 24 trains (12 in each direction) on Saturdays, and by all 18 trains (nine in each direction) on Sundays and holidays.

Itasca station is located near the Itasca Country Club. Daily parking is available for $1.50 per day along the south side of the tracks along Irving Park Road near Willow Street, and Schiller Street between 1st and Rush Streets. Permit parking is on the north side of the tracks on the corner of Orchard and Maple Streets. Permits are on a three-month basis and cost $50 for residents of Itasca and $75 for non-residents.

Bus connections

Gallery

References

External links 

Station House from Google Maps Street View

Metra stations in Illinois
Former Chicago, Milwaukee, St. Paul and Pacific Railroad stations
Railway stations in DuPage County, Illinois
Railway stations in the United States opened in 1890